Mancheng District is a district of west-central Hebei province, China, in the eastern foothills of the Taihang Mountains. It is administratively part of Baoding prefecture-level city, of which the Mancheng is a northwestern suburb.

Mancheng is the site of the Han dynasty tombs of Prince Jing of Zhongshan, Liu Sheng and his wife Dou Wan.

Administrative divisions
There is 1 subdistrict, 5 towns and 7 townships under the county's administration.

Subdistricts:
Huiyang Subdistrict

Towns:
Mancheng, Daceying, Shenxing, Nanhancun, Fangshunqiao

Townships:
Yujiazhuang Township, Xiantai Township, Yaozhuang Township, Bailong Township, Shijing Township, Tuonan Township, Liujiatai Township

Climate

References

External links

County-level divisions of Hebei
Geography of Baoding